War Games is the third studio album by German heavy metal band Grave Digger, released on 1 February 1986 through Noise Records. The official lyrics of the album have only been released with the 1994 Japanese re-release.

Track listing

Lineup
 Chris Boltendahl –vocals
 Peter Masson – guitar
 C. F. Frank – bass
 Albert Eckhardt – drums

Additional musician
Michael "Flexig" Flechsig – backing vocals

Production
Chris Boltendahl – producer, cover concept
Jan Němec – producer, engineering, mixing, mastering
Karl-U. Walterbach – executive producer

References

1986 albums
Grave Digger (band) albums
Noise Records albums